is the seventh album by the J-pop idol group Morning Musume. It is the first album to feature 7th generation member Koharu Kusumi and first album after graduation of Kaori Iida and Rika Ishikawa and departure of Mari Yaguchi. It was released on February 15, 2006.

Overview

The album features the last single A-sides to feature founding member Kaori Iida and long-time members Rika Ishikawa and Mari Yaguchi, all of whom departed the band (Iida for a solo career, Yaguchi because of a scandal though she now works as a general entertainer, Ishikawa to focus on her new group V-u-den) in the months after their previous studio album, Ai no Dai 6 Kan, was released. Although their vocals are heard on these tracks, they are not credited anywhere in the liner notes. One of the singles represented, "Chokkan 2 (Nogashita Sakana wa Ōkiizo!)", appears in remixed form.

Three of the songs on the album are performed by smaller clusters of several group members, and are credited in the liner notes to the featured members involved, rather than to the entire band.

Two different versions of the album were released, different from the usual "first press" versions. The limited edition version contained a 32-page photobook and had special packaging. When the two versions were announced it was said that each version (limited and normal) would have a different bonus track but, due to a problem on the manufacturer's end, the idea was abandoned.

Track listing
 
 
 
 
 Indigo Blue Love
Performed by Risa Niigaki, Reina Tanaka and Eri Kamei.
 
Performed by Koharu Kusumi and Sayumi Michishige.
 
 
Performed by Hitomi Yoshizawa, Makoto Ogawa, Ai Takahashi, Asami Konno and Miki Fujimoto.

Personnel

 Hitomi Yoshizawa – vocals (all tracks except 5 and 6)
 Ai Takahashi – vocals (all tracks except 5 and 6)
 Asami Konno – vocals (all tracks except 5 and 6)
 Makoto Ogawa – vocals (all tracks except 5 and 6)
 Risa Niigaki – vocals (all tracks except 6 and 8)
 Miki Fujimoto – vocals (all tracks except 5 and 6)
 Eri Kamei – vocals (all tracks except 6 and 8)
 Sayumi Michishige – vocals (all tracks except 5 and 8)
 Reina Tanaka – vocals (all tracks except 6 and 8)
 Koharu Kusumi – vocals (all tracks except 2, 4, 5 and 8)
 Kaori Iida – vocals (track 2 only, uncredited)
 Mari Yaguchi – vocals (tracks 2 and 4 only, uncredited)
 Rika Ishikawa – vocals (tracks 2 and 4 only, uncredited)
 Tsunku – Composer, vocals (background)
 Akira – keyboards, MIDI programming, backing vocals
 Hojin Egawa – bass
 Funky Sueyoshi – drums
 Ken Matsubara – all instruments (Track 2)
 Hideyuki "Daichi" Suzuki – guitar, keyboards, MIDI programming
 Yoshinari Takegami – brass arrangement, saxophone
 Masanori Suzuki – trumpet
 Masakki Ikeda – trombone
 Eiji Taniguchi – clarinet
 You Uchida – backing vocals
 Hiroaki Takeuchi – backing vocals
 Atsuko Inaba – backing vocals
 Yuichi Takahashi – guitar, keyboards, MIDI programming, backing vocals
 Hello! Project Wonderful Hearts Tour Staff – backing vocals
 Koji – electric guitar
 Masayoshi Furukawa – acoustic guitar
 Yasushi Sasamoto – bass
 Kaoru Ohkubo – keyboards, MIDI programming
 Taro Irie – bass
 Makoto Katayama – guitar
 Shoichiro Hirata – keyboards, MIDI programming
 Toru Kinoshita – guitar
 Hiroshi Iida – percussion
 Shunsuke Suzuki – keyboards, MIDI programming, guitar
 Kotaro Egami – remixing (Track 11)
 Hiroshi Imade – blues harp
 Siroh Tsubuyaki – tsubuyaki

Production
Kazami Matsui - recording and mixing engineer
Ryo Wakizaka - recording and mixing engineer
Takeshi Yanagisawa - recording engineer
Shinnosuke Kobayashi - recording engineer
Tsunku - mix engineer
Yuichi Ohtsubo - second engineer
Hirofumi Hiraki - second engineer
Youhei Horiuchi - second engineer
Yasuji Yasman Maeda - mastering engineer

External links
Rainbow 7 entry at Up-Front Works

2006 albums
Morning Musume albums
Zetima albums